CPIF may refer to:

 Check Point Integrity Flex
 Cost-plus-incentive fee